Sinan Şamil Sam (23 June 1974 – 30 October 2015) was a Turkish heavyweight professional boxer(Azerbaijani origin). As a professional boxer, Sam won the EBU,WBC 
international and WBC Mediterranean titles in the heavyweight division.  According to his former managers, Sam died after battling liver and kidney failure.

Amateur career 
Sinan Şamil Sam won Turkish Amateur Boxing Championship nine times.

Highlights
 Junior European Championships (Middleweight), Edinburgh, Scotland, 1992:
 Quarterfinals: Defeated Istvan Kozak (Hungary) KO 1
 Semifinals: Defeated Chris Davies (Wales) 8:7
 Finals: Lost to Vassiliy Jirov (Kazakhstan) 7:11

 Junior World Championships (Light Heavyweight), Montreal, Canada, 1992.
 Preliminaries: Defeated Jay Massie (Canada) 8:2
 Quarterfinals: Defeated Dmitriy Gorbachov (Russia) 14:5
 Semifinals: Defeated Yuriy Dvornikov (Ukraine) 17:6
 Finals: Defeated Alexander Gonzalez (Puerto Rico) 11:1

 1993 Mediterranean Games (Light Heavyweight), Languedoc-Roussillon, France, 1993.
 Semifinals: Defeated Mohamed Benguesmia (Algeria) on points
 Finals: Defeated Vasilikos Paris (Greece) TKO 1

 European Championships (Light Heavyweight), Bursa, Turkey, 1993.
 Preliminaries: Defeated Kelly Oliver (England) TKO 1
 Quarterfinals: Defeated Ervins Chelmanis (Latvia) 6:1 
 Semifinals: Defeated Sven Ottke (Germany) 4:2
 Finals: Lost to Igor Kshinin (Russia) 2:2+

 World Military Games (Heavyweight), Rome, Italy, 1995:
 Quarterfinals: Defeated Ionas Dambrauskas (Lithuania) 12:1
 Semifinals: Lost to Wladimir Klitschko (Ukraine) 2:12

 World Championships (Heavyweight), Berlin, Germany, 1995:
 Preliminaries: Defeated Kwamena Turkson (Sweden) 6:4
 Preliminaries: Defeated DaVarryl Williamson (United States) 10:0
 Quarterfinals: Defeated Mustafa Amrou (Egypt) TKO 3
 Semifinals: Lost to Luan Krasniqi (Germany) 3:7

 European Championships (Super Heavyweight), Minsk, Belarus, 1998.
 Preliminaries: Defeated Mirko Filipović (Croatia) 5:1
 Quarterfinals: Defeated Patrick Halberg (Denmark) 3:0
 Semifinals: Lost to Alexey Lezin (Russia)) 3:9

 World Championships (Super Heavyweight), Houston, Texas, 1999.
 Preliminaries: Defeated Tomasz Bonin (Poland) 8:3
 Quarterfinals: Defeated Audley Harrison (England) 4:3
 Semifinals: Defeated Felix Diachuk (Russia) 10:3 
 Finals: Defeated Mukhtarkhan Dildabekov (Kazakhstan) +4:4

Professional career 
Sam, known as "Bull of the Bosphorus", turned professional in 2000. He won his first 18 fights, including victories over Przemyslaw Saleta, Danny Williams, and Julius Francis.

In 2003, he suffered his first professional defeat to Juan Carlos Gómez and lost the following fight against Luan Krasniqi.

In 2005, he beat Lawrence Clay Bey to set up a fight with Oleg Maskaev, a fight which he lost on points by unanimous decision. After the loss to Maskaev he defeated Saul Montana in 2006, but then lost a WBC eliminator to Oliver McCall in June 2007.

After three more victories against limited opponents he fought Paolo Vidoz on July 4, 2008; he won the fight by majority decision.

Professional boxing record

{|class="wikitable" style="text-align:center; font-size:95%"
|-
!Result
!Record
!Opponent
!Type
!Round, time
!Date
!Location
!Notes
|- align=center

|Win||31–4||align=left| Paolo Vidoz
|||||
|align=left|
|align=left|   
|- align=center
|Win||30–4||align=left| Ratko Draskovic
|||||
|align=left|
|align=left| 
|- align=center
|Win||29–4||align=left| Mazur Ali
|||||
|align=left|
|align=left| 
|- align=center
|Win||28–4||align=left| Ivica Perkovic
|||||
|align=left|
|align=left| 
|- align=center
|Loss||27–4||align=left| Oliver McCall
|||||
|align=left|
|align=left|
|- align=center
|Win||27–3||align=left| Bob Mirovic
|||||
|align=left|
|align=left|
|- align=center
|Win||26–3||align=left| Saul Montana
|||||
|align=left|
|align=left|
|- align=center
|Win||25–3||align=left| George Arias
|||||
|align=left|
|align=left| 
|- align=center
|Loss||24–3||align=left| Oleg Maskaev
|||||
|align=left|
|align=left|
|- align=center
|Win||24–2||align=left| Okello Peter
|||||
|align=left|
|align=left|
|- align=center
|Win||23–2||align=left| Lawrence Clay Bey
|||||
|align=left|
|align=left|
|- align=center
|Win||22–2||align=left| Denis Bakhtov
|||||
|align=left|
|align=left| 
|- align=center
|Win||21–2||align=left| Siarhei Dychkou
|||||
|align=left|
|align=left|
|- align=center
|Win||20–2||align=left| Doug Liggion
|||||
|align=left|
|align=left|
|- align=center
|Win||19–2||align=left| Edgars Kalnars
|||||
|align=left|
|align=left|
|- align=center
|Loss||18–2||align=left| Luan Krasniqi
|||||
|align=left|
|align=left|EBU Heavyweight Title. 115-113, 116-113, 114-114.}
|- align=center
|Loss||18–1||align=left| Juan Carlos Gómez
|||||
|align=left|
|align=left|
|- align=center
|Win||18–0||align=left| Julius Francis
|||||
|align=left|
|align=left| 
|- align=center
|Win||17–0||align=left| Danny Williams
|||||
|align=left|
|align=left| 
|- align=center
|Win||16–0||align=left| Przemysław Saleta
|||||
|align=left|
|align=left|  
|- align=center
|Win||15–0||align=left| Roman Bugaj
|||||
|align=left|
|align=left|
|- align=center
|Win||14–0||align=left| Thomas Williams
|||||
|align=left|
|align=left|
|- align=center
|Win||13–0||align=left| Chris Isaac
|||||
|align=left|
|align=left|
|- align=center
|Win||12–0||align=left| Henry Kolle Njume
|||||
|align=left|
|align=left|
|- align=center
|Win||11–0||align=left| Ratko Draskovic
|||||
|align=left|
|align=left|
|- align=center
|Win||10–0||align=left| Yuriy Yelistratov
|||||
|align=left|
|align=left|
|- align=center
|Win||9–0||align=left| Stanyslav Tovkachov
|||||
|align=left|
|align=left|
|- align=center
|Win||8–0||align=left| Denis Edwige
|||||
|align=left|
|align=left|
|- align=center
|Win||7–0||align=left| Willie Chapman
|||||
|align=left|
|align=left|
|- align=center
|Win||6–0||align=left| Bradley Rone
|||||
|align=left|
|align=left|
|- align=center
|Win||5–0||align=left| Vlado Szabo
|||||
|align=left|
|align=left|
|- align=center
|Win||4–0||align=left| Eduardo Antonio Carranza
|||||
|align=left|
|align=left|
|- align=center
|Win||3–0||align=left| Daniel Jerling
|||||
|align=left|
|align=left|
|- align=center
|Win||2–0||align=left| Alex Kosztopulosz
|||||
|align=left|
|align=left|
|- align=center
|Win||1–0||align=left| Frantisek Sumina
|||||
|align=left|
|align=left|

References

External links
 
 News and Pictures of Sinan Samil Sam

1974 births
2015 deaths
Sportspeople from Frankfurt
Turkish male boxers
German male boxers
Turkish people of Azerbaijani descent
German people of Turkish descent
German people of Azerbaijani descent
Light-heavyweight boxers
Heavyweight boxers
Super-heavyweight boxers
European Boxing Union champions
Mediterranean Games silver medalists for Turkey
Mediterranean Games medalists in boxing
Competitors at the 1997 Mediterranean Games
AIBA World Boxing Championships medalists
Burials at Karşıyaka Cemetery, Ankara